Žarko Obradović (born 21 May 1960) is a Serbian politician who served as the minister of education from 2008 to 2013.

He holds a position of Lecturer at the Megatrend University and the Dean at the University's Faculty of Public Administration.

Biography
Born at Ivangrad (now Berane) in Montenegro, Obradović graduated from the Faculty of Political Sciences at the University of Belgrade, where he later also received his MA and PhD. He has published two books and ten papers.

From 1998 until 2000, he was Deputy Minister for Local Self-Government and in the Interim Government, while from October 2000 until January 2001 he held the position of Deputy Minister of Higher Education.

He has been MP since 2001. He was President and Deputy President of the Socialist Party of Serbia caucus in the Serbian parliament and has been Deputy President of the Socialist Party of Serbia from December 2006.

On 7 July 2008 he was appointed Minister of Education in the Cabinet of Mirko Cvetković, and held that position in the Cabinet of Ivica Dačić as well until Cabinet reshuffle in 2013.

Apart from his native Serbian, he speaks English fluently and has a working knowledge of French.

Personal life
He is married, and has two daughters.

References

External links

1960 births
Living people
People from Berane
Serbs of Montenegro
Vasojevići
Socialist Party of Serbia politicians
Members of the National Assembly (Serbia)
University of Belgrade Faculty of Political Science alumni
Government ministers of Serbia
Education ministers of Serbia